Havoc is an upcoming 2023 British-American action thriller film written and directed by Gareth Evans. The film stars Tom Hardy.

Premise
After a drug deal goes awry, a detective must fight his way through a criminal underworld to rescue a politician's estranged son, while untangling his city's dark web of conspiracy and corruption.

Cast
 Tom Hardy as Walker
 Forest Whitaker
 Timothy Olyphant
 Justin Cornwell
 Jessie Mei Li as Ellie
 Yeo Yann Yann
 Quelin Sepulveda
 Luis Guzmán
 Sunny Pang
 Michelle Waterson
 Richard Pepper

Production
On February 19, 2021, it was announced that The Raids Gareth Evans was attached to direct the film from a screenplay he wrote under his exclusive deal with Netflix. Evans was also announced as a producer on the film alongside Tom Hardy and Ed Talfan for Severn Screen as well as Aram Tertzakian of XYZ Films.

Alongside the initial announcement, Tom Hardy was cast in a lead role. Forest Whitaker was added to the cast the following month. In June 2021, Timothy Olyphant, Justin Cornwell, Jessie Mei Li, and Yeo Yann Yann joined the main cast, with Quelin Sepulveda, Luis Guzmán, Sunny Pang, and Michelle Waterson cast in supporting roles.

The film began principal photography on July 8, 2021, in Cardiff, Wales, where production will predominantly take place. The film is set to be "one of the biggest films ever to be produced in Wales" and will leave a "lasting legacy for filmmakers". Hardy was sighted at the Barry Island Pleasure Park in South Wales and outside the Brangwyn Hall in Swansea in July and August 2021 respectively. Havoc will also be the first film ever to utilise the WonderWorks mobile nursery. On October 22, 2021, filming officially wrapped up.

References

External links
 

Upcoming films
American action thriller films
British action thriller films
English-language Netflix original films
Films about corruption in the United Kingdom
Films about the illegal drug trade
Films directed by Gareth Evans
Films shot in Cardiff
Films shot in Swansea
Upcoming English-language films
Upcoming Netflix original films